The Beach Volleyball at the 2006 Central American and Caribbean Games was held November 19–30, 2002 in San Salvador, El Salvador.

Women's competition

Men's competition

See also
 Volleyball at the 2002 Central American and Caribbean Games

References
 Newspaper Results
 Newspaper Results

2002 Central American and Caribbean Games
Central American and Caribbean Games
2002